Angela Maria Guidi Cingolani (31 October 1896 – 11 August 1991) was an Italian politician. She was a member of the Christian Democratic Society and became a minister.

Life
Guidi Cingolani was born in Rome in 1896.

She was a member of the Popular Party and the Young Women of Catholic Action.

In 1948 following the fall of the Fascists from power, she was elected to the 1948 Italian government with a number of other women.

Between 1951 and 1953 she was the first Italian woman to be Secretary of State to the Minister of Industry and Commerce.

Guidi Cingolani died in Rome in 1991.

References

1896 births
1991 deaths
Politicians from Rome
Italian People's Party (1919) politicians
Christian Democracy (Italy) politicians
Members of the National Council (Italy)
Members of the Constituent Assembly of Italy
Deputies of Legislature I of Italy
20th-century Italian women politicians
Women members of the Chamber of Deputies (Italy)